Šmihel pri Žužemberku is a village on the right bank of the Krka River in the Municipality of Žužemberk in southeastern Slovenia. The area is part of the historical region of Lower Carniola. The municipality is now included in the Southeast Slovenia Statistical Region.

Name
The name of the settlement was changed from Šmihel to Šmihel pri Žužemberku in 1955.

Church

The local church from which the settlement gets its name is dedicated to Saint Michael and belongs to the Parish of Žužemberk. It was built in 1908 on the site of a previous church first mentioned in written documents dating to 1136.

References

External links

Šmihel pri Žužemberku at Geopedia

Populated places in the Municipality of Žužemberk